Germania Bietigheim can refer to the following German association football clubs:

 SV Germania Bietigheim 1909, a football club in Württemberg.
 SV Germania Bietigheim Baden, a football club in Baden.